EPPP may refer to: 
Elite Player Performance Plan
Environmental persistent pharmaceutical pollutant 
Examination for Professional Practice in Psychology
Enhanced Potential Pandemic Pathogens